The Ladies' Scottish Climbing Club was founded by Jane Inglis Clark, her daughter Mabel, and Lucy Smith at a boulder near Lix Toll, Perthshire in 1908. It now has about 120 members and is the oldest active climbing club exclusively for women. The club has sent numerous expeditions abroad and made the first all-woman climb of a major peak in the Himalayas.

Founding
The club was founded by three experienced climbers: Jane Inglis Clark, her daughter Mabel, and Lucy Smith.  Miss Smith was the daughter of a president of the Scottish Mountaineering Club and Mrs Inglis Clark's husband William Inglis Clark was secretary, but as women they were not allowed to join the all-male club. The Ladies' Alpine Club had been formed in London in 1907 and so, while sheltering by a large boulder at Lix Toll on 18 April 1908, the three decided to form a similar club in Scotland. A committee meeting was held in May which established the club's constitution and purpose: "to bring together Ladies who are lovers of mountain-climbing, and to encourage mountaineering in Scotland, in winter as well as in summer."  The first president of the club was Mrs Inglis Clark while Lucy Smith was treasurer, Miss Inglis Clark was secretary, and Ruth Raeburn the librarian.

Development
In its first year, the club had fourteen members.  Its equipment included alpine rope which had been fixed to the Cobbler and the Salisbury Crags in Edinburgh where the members trained.  To qualify, members had to ascend four peaks of at least 3,000 feet with two snow climbs and two rock climbs.  They then went on bold climbs of mountains such as the Beuckle (Buachaille Etive Mòr) and Suilven.  To be decent, they would start their climbs in long skirts but, when no men were around, would often discard these to climb in knickerbockers.  They attracted climbers from Glasgow too and the total membership in the early years was about 70.  In 1947, the club took a lease on its first climbing hut—Blackrock Cottage near Glencoe—and the second was added in 1963—Milehouse Cottage near Kincraig.  From these and other bases, numerous Scottish mountains were climbed and member Annie Hirst was the first woman to climb all the Munros—the 282 Scottish peaks higher than 3,000 feet.

Expeditions
In 1928, a club expedition to the Alps was organised.  Subsequent expeditions were made to other climbing regions abroad such as the Caucasus and Yosemite.  In 1955, the club made the first all-woman team expedition to the Himalayas, made up of Monica Jackson, Evelyn McNicol and Elizabeth Stark, where they were the first to climb a 22,000-foot peak in the Jugal Himal which they named Gyalzen Peak.

Anniversaries
In 1958, the first secretary made a speech upon the club's 50th anniversary as its president.  Mabel Jeffrey was now married and brought her grandchildren to the celebrations at the site of the club's founding at the boulder at Lix Toll.

In 2008, the centenary was celebrated with a party of the membership in period costume on top of the Beuckle. President Helen Steven recalled the youngest founder, "I knew Mabel and remember her as very warm, rosy-cheeked and welcoming – she came into a room like a burst of sunshine. But she was hard as old nails. They were all characters..."

References

Citations

Sources

External links
Official website

1908 establishments in Scotland
Climbing clubs in the United Kingdom
Climbing organizations
Climbing in Scotland
Women's organisations based in Scotland
Sports organizations established in 1908